Discovery Bay Transportation Services Ltd (DBTSL) (Traditional Chinese: 愉景灣航運服務有限公司) is a transport company which provides ferry and bus services to Discovery Bay on Lantau Island. It is subsidiary of the HKR International group.

Bus Services 
DBTS operates 21 bus routes within and outside of Discovery Bay (DB).

Temporary Routes 
Due to the renovation of DB Bus Terminus, a temporary bus terminus and bus stops have been constructed.

Fares remain unchanged and routes that don't go to the terminus are also unchanged.

Ferry Services
DBTS is a 24-hour high-speed ferry service between Tai Pak Bay Pier and Pier 3 in Central District on Hong Kong Island. The travel time of approximately 25–30 minutes with frequency of around 20–30 minutes during day time, up to 90 minutes during night times; additional services are operated during peak/rush hours.

DBTS has operated the following routes but ceased.
Discovery Bay to Mui Wo
Discovery Bay to Chek Lap Kok
Tuen Mun to Chek Lap Kok and Tung Chung
Central to Tsim Sha Tsui East

Fares

As of June 2018, tickets are HK$46 for a single journey; time limited, stored value ticket charge $43.5 per trip. Overnight ferries (from midnight) have an additional surcharge of $19.5 for single journey and $19 for stored value ticket.

Fleet

See also

 Star Ferry
 Hong Kong and Yaumati Ferry
 Hong Kong & Kowloon Ferry

References

 Guy Photo Collections

Ferry transport in Hong Kong
Discovery Bay
HKR International
Shipping companies of Hong Kong